Bryce Shapley (born 26 December 1974) is an ex-professional New Zealand cyclist who last rode for Flanders - Prefetex.

Major results

1998
 2nd National Cross Country MTB 
2000
 2nd Overall Tour of Wellington
1st Stage 5  
2001
 1st Stage 2 Ytong Bohemia Tour
 3rd National Time Trial Championship
2002
 3rd Overall Tour of Wellington

References

1974 births
Living people
New Zealand male cyclists